This is a list of episodes of Langt fra Las Vegas, a Danish sitcom.

Episodes

Season one
 En Ordentlig Sneppetur (A Big Sandpiper Trip)
 Trillekød (Trille Meat)
 Danish Dynamite
 Ordnung Muss Sein
 Kærlighedspokalen (The Love Cup)
 Proletarkæden (Proletarian's Chain)
 Sexfreak
 Se & Hor (Watch & Fornicate)
 Heidi, Del 1
 Heidi, Del 2
 En på Egnsdragten (One On The Region's Suit)
 IT Phone Home
 Helmig Fucki Fucki

Season two
 Lars Herlow
 Mia Hundvin
 John Travolta
 Mek Pek
 Mufufu
 Michel
 Liva
 Mogens K. Eberhart
 Monsieur Dipp
 Oliver

Season three
 Feng Shui
 Kat (Cat)
 Laust
 Polle Pot
 Bedste, det er bare mig (Granny, It's Just Me)
 Tis (Pee)
 Jeopardy
 Kærlighed gør blind (Love Is Blind)
 Som søn så far (As Father As Son)
 Det sidste ord (The Last Word)

Season four
 Pressemødet (The Press Conference)
 Don't Wanna Lus You Now
 Starfucker
 Mere møs til Dennis (More Kisses For Dennis)
 Tino, Gunnar og en hel krukke bolsjer (Tino, Gunnar And A Whole Jar Of Candy)
 Ultimate Kosher
 Arrivederci Kenny
 Nestor
 Trøstepagten (The Pact Of Comfort)
 Kammeratstolen (The Companion Chair)

Season five
 Skat (Tax)
 DVD-aftener (DVD Nights)
 Den forsølvede barnesko (The Silver-Plated Children's Shoe)
 Hvem ka' Lie Kaas (Who Likes Lie Kaas)
 Picaspero
 Onani
 Who's Your Daddy
 Herretur (Man's Trip)
 Kim og femidomet (Kim And The Female Condom)
 Et fister øjeblik (A Fister Moment)

Langt fra Las Vegas